Morelos Nahuatl includes varieties of the Nahuatl language that are spoken in the state of Morelos, Mexico. In Morelos, Nahuatl is spoken in the communities of Cuentepec, Hueyapan, Santa Catarina, Xoxocotla, Atlacholoayan and Tetelcingo. But Tetelcingo Nahuatl is usually considered a separate variety due to its highly innovative phonology, and has very low mutual intelligibility with the other Morelos variants. Ethnologue also considers the varieties of San Felipe Tocla and Alpanocan to belong to the Morelos Nahuatl group of dialects  although they are located in the state of Puebla. The dialects belong to the Central dialects closely related to Classical Nahuatl.

References

External links
Morelos Nahuatl at SIL-MX
Morelos Nahuatl alphabet
Founding of Cuentepec in Nahuatl, in English

Further reading
Dakin, Karen and Ryesky, Diana. 1990. Morelos Nahuatl Dialects: Hypotheses on their historical divisions. Morelos en una economia global. Proceedings of the Congress in Cocoyoc, Morelos, November 19023, 1989. Submitted in January 1990
Barrios E., M. 1949. Textos de Hueyapan, Morelos. Tlalocan 3:53-75.
Johansson, Patrick, Johansson, Patrick. 1989. El sistema de expresion reverencial en Hueyapan, Morelos. Tlalocan XI. 149-162

Pequeño diccionario ilustrado; Náhuatl de Cuentepec, Morelos. 2005.  1st ed. Tlalpan, D.F. Mexico: Instituto Lingüístico de Verano. 32 pages

Nahuatl